NepaLinux was a Debian and Morphix-based Linux distribution focused on desktop usage in Nepali language computing.

It contains applications for desktop users, such as OpenOffice.org, Nepali GNOME and KDE desktops, Nepali input method editor.

The development and distribution of NepaLinux was done by Madan Puraskar Pustakalaya. Version 1.0 was produced as part of the PAN Localization Project, with the support of the International Development Research Centre (IDRC) of Canada. NepaLinux is an effort of promoting free and open-source software in Nepal.

In October 2007, NepaLinux was the joint recipient of the Association for Progressive Communications' annual APC FOSS prize.

References

 

Knoppix
Language-specific Linux distributions
Linux distributions